The Optare Prisma was a single-decker bus body that was fitted to the Mercedes-Benz O405 chassis. The body was constructed from Alusuisse aluminium alloy.

The front end of the body was built by Mercedes-Benz as standard. The sides and back end of the body followed the styling of other Optare products at that time, such as the Delta and Vecta.

A total of 121 were manufactured between 1995 and 1998, major purchasers being Grampian Regional Transport (35), Tees & District (25), East Yorkshire Motor Services (16), Eastern Scottish (10) and Leicester Citybus (10).

References

External links

Prisma